Gaano Kadalas ang Minsan? is a 1982 Filipino romantic drama film directed by Danny Zialcita and co-written by Zialcita and Tom D. Adrales. It stars Vilma Santos, Hilda Koronel and Dindo Fernando. Released by Viva Films on November 25, 1982, it was a box office success, and was the highest-grossing film of the year. Critic Justino Dormiendo gave the film a positive review, praising Zialcita's direction and the entire cast's performances. It won six FAMAS Awards, including Best Screenplay (Zialcita and Adrales), Best Story (Adrales), and Best Musical Score (George Canseco).

Cast
Vilma Santos as Lily
Hilda Koronel as Elsa
Dindo Fernando as Louie
Suzanne Gonzales
Joseph Alvin Enriquez as Lily's son
Angie Ferro
Odette Khan
Mario Escudero
Ven Medina
Gloria Romero
Josephine Estrada
Ronaldo Valdez
Tommy Abuel
Anna Gonzales
Delia Razon
Chanda Romero

Release
Gaano Kadalas ang Minsan was released on November 25, 1982, and was a box-office success, becoming the highest-grossing film of the year.

Critical response
Justino Dormiendo, writing for Jingle Extra Hot!, gave the film a positive review, praising the entire cast for their performances as well as director Danny Zialcita for finding a fresh angle to a cliché love triangle storyline. He gave high acclaim to Vilma Santos' performance as the mistress Lily, stating that "[b]ecause her role has more substance and because [she] seemed to have perfected the agony of the other woman, her performance overshadowed Hilda Koronel's", while Dindo Fernando was "effective" in his performance as Louie. However, Dormiendo criticized the costume design for being overly conspicuous and distracting.

Accolades

References

External links

1982 films
1982 romantic drama films
Filipino-language films
Adultery in films
Films about cancer
Philippine romance films
Philippine romantic drama films
Viva Films films